Papyrus Oxyrhynchus 654 (P. Oxy. 654) is a papyrus fragment of the logia of Jesus written in Greek. It is one of the Oxyrhynchus Papyri discovered by Grenfell and Hunt between 1897 and 1904 in the Egyptian town of Oxyrhynchus. The fragment is dated to the middle or late of the 3rd century. It is one of only three Greek manuscripts of the Gospel of Thomas.

Description 
The manuscript was written on papyrus in scroll form. The measurements of the original leaf were 142 mm by 155 mm. The text is written in cursive letters, in a competent hand. It uses diaeresis over initial upsilon; two corrections were made. The nomina sacra are written in an abbreviated way ( for  Jesus).

According to Grenfell and Hunt, who identified this fragment as Logia Iesu ("Sayings of Jesus"), the original manuscript contained a collection of Jesus's sayings. They suggested that original manuscript could be a part of the Gospel of Thomas, or Gospel of Philip. The only complete copy of the Gospel of Thomas was found in 1945 when a Coptic version was discovered at Nag Hammadi with a collection of early Christian Gnostic texts.

The fragment contains logia (sayings) 1–7 of the Gospel of Thomas on the verso side of the leaf (opisthograph).
Grenfell and Hunt also discovered another two fragments of this apocryphal Gospel: P. Oxy. 1 and P. Oxy. 655.

In 1904, P. Oxy. 654 was given to the British Museum by the Egypt Exploration Fund. The fragment is housed at the Department of manuscripts of the British Library (Inv. 1531) in London.

See also 
 Oxyrhynchus Papyri

References

Further reading 
 
 Nicholas Perrin, HC II,2 and the Oxyrhynchus Fragments (P. Oxy 1, 654, 655): Overlooked Evidence for a Syriac "Gospel of Thomas", Vigiliae Christianae, Vol. 58, No. 2 (May, 2004), pp. 138–151

External links 
 P. Oxy. 654 LDAB
 Papyri.info (654 P. Oxy. 4 = Trismegistos 62840 = LDAB 4030)
 British Library Digitised Manuscripts Papyrus 1531
 The Gospel of Thomas: Papyrus Oxyrhynchus 654
 Papyrus Oxyrhynchus 654

654
Gnostic Gospels
3rd-century manuscripts
British Library collections